William Rutter Dawes (19 March 1799 – 15 February 1868) was an English astronomer.

Biography
Dawes was born at Christ's Hospital then in the City of London (it moved to Horsham, West Sussex in 1902), the son of William Dawes, also an astronomer, and Judith Rutter. He qualified as a doctor in 1825. On 29 October 1828 he was ordained pastor at an Independent chapel in Burscough Street, Ormskirk, Lancashire, formerly part of a silk factory. A new chapel, in Chapel Street, was opened in 1834. Dawes resigned as pastor in December 1837 due to ill health. When, in 1843, the chapel got into financial difficulties due to the debt owing after its construction, Dawes came to their aid.

Astronomy

 
Dawes made extensive measurements of double stars as well as observations of planets.  He was a friend of William Lassell. He was nicknamed "eagle eyed".  He set up his private observatory at his home, Hopefield House, built 1856-7 in Haddenham, Buckinghamshire.  One of his telescopes, an eight-inch (200mm) aperture refractor by Cooke, survives at the Cambridge Observatory, now part of the Institute of Astronomy where it is known as the Thorrowgood Telescope.

He made extensive drawings of Mars during its 1864 opposition.  In 1867, Richard Anthony Proctor made a map of Mars based on these drawings. Proctor named two features after Dawes.

He was elected a Fellow of the Royal Astronomical Society in 1830 and a Fellow of the Royal Society in 1865, for his astronomical work. Proposers for his Royal Society Fellowship included G B Airy and  J F W Herschel.

Awards

He won the Gold Medal of the Royal Astronomical Society in 1855.

Legacy

Dawes craters on the Moon and Dawes  crater on Mars are named after him, as is a gap within Saturn's C Ring, formerly labelled 1.495 RS.

An optical phenomenon, the Dawes limit, is named after him.

Family

Dawes married twice. His first wife was Mary Scott née Egerton (1764-1840). They married on  13 January 1824 at Haddenham, Buckinghamshire. She was the widow of his tutor, Thomas Scott. On 28 July 1842 Dawes married Ann Welsby née Coupland (1805-1860). She was the widow of Ormskirk solicitor John Welsby (1800-1839) whom she had married on 16 January 1824.

Selected writings

References

Further reading 

   (Adapted from Sky & Telescope, July 1973, page 27)

External links

 
 Monthly Notices of the Royal Astronomical Society, 1855, 15, 148 - Awarding of RAS gold medal
 Monthly Notices of the Royal Astronomical Society, 1869, 29, 116 - Obituary
 The Observatory, 1913, 36, 419 - Brief biography
 McKim, R., Marriott, R. A., "Dawes' Observations Of Mars, 1864-65", Journal of the British Astronomical Association, vol.98, no.6, p.294-300, October 1988. 

1799 births
1868 deaths
19th-century British astronomers
Recipients of the Gold Medal of the Royal Astronomical Society
Fellows of the Royal Society